The Norm Show is an American sitcom that aired on ABC. The series premiered at midseason in 1999, on March 24, and ran for three seasons, airing new episodes through April 6, 2001. While titled The Norm Show during the show's first season, a legal conflict with Michael Jantze's comic strip The Norm forced the show's title to be shortened to simply Norm for the series' second and third seasons.

Series overview

Episodes

Season 1 (1999)

Season 2 (1999–2000)

Season 3 (2000–2001)

References

External links

Lists of American sitcom episodes
Norm Macdonald